The UAE Four Nations Friendship Tournament, or simply Friendship Tournament, was an international football tournament held in the United Arab Emirates between four teams from 1986 to 2001. The United Arab Emirates have won the most editions, with three titles.

Results

References

External links
 Friendship Tournament at RSSSF

 
Defunct football competitions in the United Arab Emirates
International association football competitions hosted by the United Arab Emirates